María Yanina Fernández Birriel (born 19 April 1994), known as Yanina Fernández, is a Uruguayan footballer who plays as a centre back. She has been a member of the Uruguay women's national team.

International career
Fernández represented Uruguay at the 2014 South American U-20 Women's Championship. At senior level, she played the 2014 Copa América Femenina.

References 

1994 births
Living people
Women's association football central defenders
Women's association football fullbacks
Uruguayan women's footballers
People from Canelones Department
Uruguay women's international footballers